Yakima, Washington is a city in the United States.

Yakima may also refer to:

 Yakima Canutt (1896-1986), American actor and stuntman
 Yakima County, Washington, a county in Washington state
 Yakima River, a river flowing through Yakima
 Sedalia, Texas, formerly known as Yakima
 MV Yakima, a ferry based in Washington state

See also
 
 Yakama, a Native American people